The Lebanon women's national under-17 football team, colloquially known as "the Lady Cedars", represents Lebanon in international women's youth football. The team is controlled by the Lebanon Football Association (LFA), the governing body for football in Lebanon. The team also serves as the women's national under-16 and women's national under-15 football team of Lebanon.

While the team has never qualified to either the FIFA U-17 Women's World Cup or the AFC U-17 Women's Asian Cup, they have won both the Arab U-17 Women's Cup (in 2015) and the WAFF U-16 Girls Championship (in 2019 and 2023), becoming the first Lebanese national football team (men's or women's) to win a title.

Competitive record

FIFA U-17 Women's World Cup

AFC U-17 Women's Asian Cup

Arab U-17 Women's Cup

WAFF U-16 Girls Championship

Other tournaments

Recent results and matches

2022

2023

Players

Current squad
The following players were called up for the 2022 WAFF U-16 Girls Championship.

Recent call-ups
The following footballers were part of a national selection in the past 12 months, but are not part of the current squad.

See also
Lebanon women's national football team
Lebanon women's national under-20 football team
Lebanon men's national under-17 football team
Women's football in Lebanon
Football in Lebanon

Notes

References

External links

Arabic women's national under-17 association football teams
under-17
Youth football in Lebanon
Asian women's national under-17 association football teams